Sheridan College is a public community college in Sheridan, Wyoming.  It is part of the Northern Wyoming Community College District. It offers Associate of Arts, Associate of Science, and Associate of Applied Science degrees, certificate programs, and program tracks that prepare students to transfer to a four-year college or university. In addition, students may elect to enroll in career training, professional development courses, or vocational/technical programs.

Athletics
A member of the National Junior College Athletic Association, Sheridan College does not currently have competitive sports outside of the rodeo team, which is a member of the National Intercollegiate Rodeo Association.

References

External links
 Official website

Education in Sheridan County, Wyoming
Buildings and structures in Sheridan County, Wyoming
Education in Campbell County, Wyoming
Buildings and structures in Campbell County, Wyoming
Community colleges in Wyoming
NJCAA athletics